Amoebophyra (or Amoebophrya) is a genus of dinoflagellates.
Amoebophyra is a syndinian parasite that infects free-living dinoflagellates that are attributed to a
single species by using several host-specific parasites.
It acts as "biological control agents for red tides and in defining species of Amoebophrya." Researchers have found a correlation between a large amount of host specify and the impact host parasites may have on other organisms. Due to the host specificity found in each strain of Amoebophrya's physical makeup, further studies need to be tested to determine whether the Amoebophrya can act as a control against harmful algal blooms.

Amoebophyra strains 

Different strains of Amoebophyra  have been seen to infect different host species. Though research regarding the specificity of Amoebophyra is currently underway, the current hypothesis supported is that they range from non-host-specific to extremely host specific. Over twenty dinoflagellate species have been reported to be infected by some strain of Amoebophyra. It has proven to be difficult to determine whether or not a strain truly is host specific. Host specificity is confirmed not only through the strain's ability to infect various hosts, but their reproductive ability afterwards. If the Amoebophyra strain infects various hosts but is unable to successfully create following generations, then it would be considered host specific. Amoebophyra is mostly known for its correlation with harmful algal blooms (HABs). Abundance of certain strains have been linked to the decline of some HABs in marine life, while others have been found to cause it.

Infection Process 
During its lifespan, Amoebophyra alternates between a free-swimming asexual reproductive stage called the dinospore, and a multinuclear growth phase within the host called the trophont stage. A dinospore will attach to the host (biology) cell’s outer surface, then enter the cytosol. Most infections proceed within the nucleus, though some are confined to the cytoplasm. Within ten minutes, the parasite arrives at the host’s nuclear envelope and significantly increases in size during the next twenty-four hours. Hosts infected by certain strains of Amoebophyra such as Amoebophyra ceratii are unable to reproduce before the parasite completes its life cycle and kills the host. It will continue to increase in size through nuclear divisions without the need for cytokinesis, resulting in a beehive-like appearance within the host. After killing the host, Amoebophyra grows to become mobile and wormlike, but soon separates into dinospores. These new dinospores then have a short period of time in which to find new hosts, as their survival time in water is meager. The aquatic environment can greatly affect the success of Amoebophyra, as a nutrient environment can influence its reproductive ability as well as its offspring’s infectivity.

References

Dinoflagellate genera
Syndiniophyceae
Biological pest control agents